Mailinger Bach is a river of Bavaria, Germany. It flows into the Danube near Vohburg.

See also
List of rivers of Bavaria

References

Rivers of Bavaria
Rivers of Germany